Cyclophora iners is a moth in the  family Geometridae. It is found in south-eastern Peru.

References

Moths described in 1920
Cyclophora (moth)
Moths of South America